This article details scores and results from the 2012 NRL Under-20s season.

Regular season

Round 1

Source: Round 1 summary - rleague.com

Round 2

Source: Round 2 summary - rleague.com

Round 3

Source: Round 3 summary - rleague.com

Round 4

Source: Round 4 summary - rleague.com

Round 5

Source: Round 5 summary - rleague.com

Round 6

Source: Round 6 summary - rleague.com

Round 7

Source: Round 7 summary - rleague.com

Round 8

Source: Round 8 summary - rleague.com

Round 9

Source: Round 9 summary - rleague.com

Round 10

Source: Round 10 summary - rleague.com

Round 11

Source: Round 11 summary - rleague.com

Round 12

Source: Round 12 summary - rleague.com

Round 13

Source: Round 13 summary - rleague.com

Round 14

Source: Round 14 summary - rleague.com

Round 15

Source: Round 15 summary - rleague.com

Round 16

Source: Round 16 summary - rleague.com

Round 17

Source: Round 17 summary - rleague.com

Round 18

Source: Round 18 summary - rleague.com

Round 19

Source: Round 19 summary - rleague.com

Round 20

Source: Round 20 summary - rleague.com

Round 21

Round 22

Round 23

Round 24

Round 25

Round 26

Finals series

Qualifying finals

Semi finals

Preliminary finals

Grand final

Reference List

Results